Duncan Fraser was a clergyman.

Duncan Fraser may also refer to:

Duncan Cameron Fraser (1845–1910), Canadian politician
Duncan Fraser (actor), Canadian actor
Duncan Fraser, a character in Best Friends Together
Duncan Fraser, a character in Eliza Fraser
Duncan & Fraser, a former vehicle manufacturer in Australia

See also